David Gillborn (born 11 April 1962) is a British educational researcher known for his work in critical race theory as it relates to education. He is Professor of Critical Race Studies at the University of Birmingham, where he is also director of research in the School of Education and the director of the Centre for Research in Race and Education. He serves as the editor-in-chief of Race Ethnicity and Education.

Education
Gillborn received his B.A. with honors in sociology of education from the University of Nottingham in 1983, and subsequently received his Ph.D. in sociology of education from there in 1987.

Awards and honors
Gillborn received the Derrick Bell Legacy Award from the Critical Race Studies in Education Association in 2012. In 2015, he was named a laureate of Kappa Delta Pi.

References

External links
 

1962 births
Living people
Academic journal editors
Educational researchers
Academics of the University of Birmingham
Alumni of the University of Nottingham
British sociologists
Critical theorists